Ferrari has made a series of 1.6-litre, turbocharged, V6, Formula One racing engines, starting with the Tipo 059/3 designation for the 2014 season.

Development
The V6 turbo engine was developed under the direction of Luca Marmorini and Mattia Binotto.

Design
The engine itself is coupled with an energy recovery system hybrid unit, and all evolutions and newer iterations of the power unit are based on the same basic hybrid architecture that has existed since 2014.

Naming
Ferrari 059/3 was the engine's official name in the 2014 inaugural season. In the following seasons, the further expansion stages of the engine were each given new names. Formally, however, all expansion forms were based on the basic structure that has existed since 2014.

Criticism and FIA investigation
The Type 064 of the 2019 season was often criticized from the middle of the season. While Ferrari put in a strong performance throughout the 2019 season, their performance was particularly strong between the Belgian Grand Prix and the Mexican Grand Prix. During these races, Ferrari took six consecutive pole positions and scored their only victories of the season in these races. As their form had noticeably improved compared to the first 12 races of the season, Red Bull made an inquiry to the FIA and asked for clarification on whether the use of a system used by Ferrari that bypasses the fuel flow sensor is permissible. Red Bull accused Ferrari of installing the sensor in such a way that it could not measure an increased, illegal fuel flow. The FIA ​​responded with a technical guideline ahead of the US Grand Prix, reminding all competitors that such systems are not allowed. As a result, Ferrari's form faded. As the season progressed, they managed neither a pole position nor a win. Max Verstappen then publicly accused Ferrari of cheating.

After the end of testing for the 2020 season, the FIA ​​announced that it had completed its investigation into the Type 064 engine and entered into a private agreement with Ferrari. The FIA ​​refused to disclose the results of the investigation after protests from the other teams.

Applications 
Ferrari F14 T (Tipo 059/3)
Ferrari SF15-T (Tipo 059/4)
Ferrari SF16-H (Tipo 059/5)
Ferrari SF70H (Tipo 062)
Ferrari SF71H (Tipo 062 EVO)
Ferrari SF90 (Tipo 064)
Ferrari SF1000 (Tipo 065)
Ferrari SF21 (Tipo 065/6)
Ferrari SF-23 (Tipo 066/10)
Ferrari F1-75 (Tipo 066/7)
Marussia MR03
Sauber C33
Sauber C34
Sauber C35
Sauber C36
Sauber C37
Alfa Romeo Racing C38
Alfa Romeo Racing C39
Alfa Romeo Racing C41
Alfa Romeo C42
Haas VF-16
Haas VF-17
Haas VF-18
Haas VF-19
Haas VF-20
Haas VF-21
Haas VF-22
Toro Rosso STR11

References 

Ferrari engines
Formula One engines
Gasoline engines by model
V6 engines